Ragdoll is an internationally co-produced thriller series based upon the novel of the same name by Daniel Cole. In the United States, it premiered on AMC+ on November 11, 2021, and in the United Kingdom, it premiered on Alibi on December 6, 2021.

Premise
The series follows the murder of six people who have been dismembered and sewn into the shape of a grotesque body, "The Ragdoll". As detectives begin to investigate, the killer begins to taunt them.

Cast and characters

 Henry Lloyd-Hughes as DS Nathan Rose, a police officer who becomes the killer's latest target
 Thalissa Teixeira as DI Emily Baxter
 Lucy Hale as Lake Edmunds, a former LAPD officer turned DC
 Michael Smiley as DS Finlay
 Ali Cook as DCI Terrence Simmons
 Natasha Little as Andrea Wyld
 Kobna Holdbrook-Smith as Joel Shepton
 Angus Wright as Judge Wingate
 Amita Dhiri as Deputy Commissioner Vanita
 Phil Davis as Mayor Turnbull
 Camilla Beeput as Alyssa
 Douggie McMeekin as Eric Turner
 Samantha Spiro as Joy
 Sam Troughton as Thomas Massey / "The Ragdoll Killer"

Episodes

Production

Development
In February 2021, it was announced AMC and Alibi would co-produce a thriller series based upon the novel Ragdoll by Daniel Cole. Freddy Syborn would adapt the series and serve as an executive producer. Production companies involved with the series include Sid Gentle Films and AMC Studios, with BBC Studios distributing worldwide. The series premiered on November 11, 2021, on AMC+ in the United States.

Casting
In March 2021, Lucy Hale joined the cast of the series in a starring role. In April 2021, Henry Lloyd-Hughes and Thalissa Teixeira joined the cast of the series in starring roles.

Filming
Principal photography began in London in May 2021.

Reception
The review aggregator website Rotten Tomatoes reports a 90% approval rating with an average rating of 7.9/10, based on 10 critic reviews. The website's critics consensus reads, "Ragdoll avoids feeling like yet another serial killer caper sewn together from better thrillers, thanks in part to its dry humor and killer cast chemistry." On Metacritic, which uses a weighted average, assigned the series a score of 65 out of 100, based on 8 critics, indicating "generally favorable reviews".

Daniel Fienberg, of The Hollywood Reporter, called the series a "metaphor" rather than a TV show, saying that "[it] has enough unnerving moments to satisfy impressionable devotees of the genre."

References

External links
 

AMC (TV channel) original programming
English-language television shows
Television shows filmed in the United Kingdom
2021 American television series debuts